The Centre for Policy Research (CPR) is an Indian think tank focusing on public policy. Established in 1973 and located in New Delhi, it is one of the national social science research institutes recognized by the Indian Council of Social Science Research (ICSSR).

The objectives of CPR are to develop substantive policy options on matters relevant to the Indian polity, economy and society; to provide advisory services to governments, public bodies and other institutions; and to disseminate information on policy issues through various channels. The governing board of CPR consists of various public figures from Indian government, academia, and industry.

Research areas  
Based on the profiles of its faculty members, CPR focuses on the following research areas.
Urbanization and Infrastructure
International Relations
Internal and External Security
Law and Society
International Environmental Law
Legislative Research (through PRS Legislative Research)
Political Economy and Governance
Service Delivery
Economic Development

Funding
CPR, being a non-profit organisation, receives its funds from:
Its own corpus
Grants obtained for research
From governmental bodies for assistance
International Agencies and Private sector sources
Educational Testing and Policy Research
Bill and Melinda Foundation 
Open Society Foundation

Controversies 
In 2015, the Delhi Police registered a criminal complaint for breach of trust against Mehta and the Center for Policy Research in connection with a recruitment scam at the Airports Authority of India (AAI). The CPR's examination cell had been awarded a contract for conducting examinations for recruitment at the AAI. However, there were allegations that the examination results were tampered with to favour certain candidates. The CPR's examination cell has since been shut down.

On 7 September 2022, the Income Tax Department Officers conducted raids on CPR premises to investigate possible violations of the Foreign Contribution (Regulation) Act, 2010.

Notable faculty members 
Notable academicians in CPR's core faculty from various fields of public policy include:
Brahma Chellaney
Bharat Karnad
Pratap Bhanu Mehta
G. Parthasarathy
Lavanya Rajamani
Shyam Saran

International Faculty Collaborators 

 Patrick Heller

References 

Think tanks based in India
1973 establishments in Delhi
Foreign policy and strategy think tanks in India
Think tanks established in 1973